Achenkirch is a municipality in the Schwaz district in the Austrian state of Tyrol. It is located at the northern end of Lake Achensee.

Land and Climate Breakup

At the northern lakeside of Lake Achensee, there is the municipality Achenkirch and its component localities Achenkirch, Achensee, Achental and Achenwald, Scholastika and the terrain of the former Achenseehof farm. In other words, the municipal territory extends from Lake Achensee to the Bavarian border. Already in 1313 AD the village was known as “Achental”, while only in 1971 its name was changed to Achenkirch. Around the turn of the last century, Achenkirch was a popular destination for summer vacationists, including famous personalities such as the authors Peter Rosegger (1843-1918) and Ludwig Ganghofer (1855-1920). And Felix Mitterer, famous Austrian actor and playwright, was born here in 1948.

In the village and its surroundings, there are several places of cultural interest, e.g. 15 chapels dating back to the 18th, 19th and 20th century. The parish church and its bulbous spire, built in 1748, is dedicated to Saint John the Baptist. Further buildings that are worth noticing are a wine tavern that has already been mentioned in the 15th century, and which maintained its original form up to present times. It has recently been renovated, serving as tavern today. The “Salzstadel” building, however, has once upon a time been meeting point for salt merchants between the salines Hall and Munich, and today it is in private hands.

References

Cities and towns in Schwaz District